Bang Gui-man (also Bang Gwi-man, ; born May 4, 1983, in Namyangju, Gyeonggi) is a South Korean judoka, who competed in the men's lightweight category. He represented his nation South Korea at the 2004 Summer Olympics, picked up four medals in the 66 and 73-kg division at the Asian Judo Championships, and recently earned a bronze medal at the 2014 Asian Games in Incheon. Throughout his sporting career, Bang trained for Namyangju City Hall's elite judo squad under his longtime coach and mentor Cho In-chul.

Bang qualified for the South Korean squad in the men's half-lightweight class (66 kg) at the 2004 Summer Olympics in Athens, by placing third and receiving a berth from the Asian Championships in Almaty. He lost his opening match to Brazilian judoka and 1996 Olympic bronze medalist Henrique Guimarães, who successfully scored an ippon and an ōuchi gari (big inner reap), at two minutes and twenty-one seconds.

When South Korea hosted the 2014 Asian Games in Incheon, Bang culminated his ten-year career medal drought from the international scene to score an ippon victory over 2012 Olympian Navruz Jurakobilov of Uzbekistan for a bronze in the men's 73 kg class. Two days later, he helped his fellow South Korean teammates outplay their Kazakh rivals to top the medal podium with a gold in the team competition.

After the World Cup in Rome in October 2010 he tested positive for banner stimulant drug methylhexanamine and was banned for 2 years.

References

External links
 
 

1983 births
Living people
Olympic judoka of South Korea
Judoka at the 2004 Summer Olympics
Judoka at the 2014 Asian Games
Asian Games medalists in judo
People from Namyangju
South Korean male judoka
Asian Games gold medalists for South Korea
Asian Games bronze medalists for South Korea
Medalists at the 2014 Asian Games
Sportspeople from Gyeonggi Province